Arlt is a surname. Notable people with the name Arlt include:

Carl Ferdinand von Arlt (1812–1887), Austrian ophthalmologist
Fritz Arlt (1912–2004), German Nazi Party official
Johannes Arlt (born 1984), German politician
Lewis Arlt, American director, actor, and writer
Paul Theodore Arlt (1914–2005), American painter
Mirta Arlt (1923–2014), Argentine writer and theatre scholar
Roberto Arlt (1900–1942), Argentine writer
Tobias Arlt (born 1987), German luger
Willi Arlt (1919–1947), German footballer

See also
Association for the Reform of Latin Teaching (ARLT)

de:Arlt